Albert William Joseph Spilsbury (1894–1959) was an English professional footballer who played as a goalkeeper in the Football League for Bury.

Personal life 
Spilsbury served as a sergeant in the Worcestershire Regiment during the First World War.

References 

English Football League players
Place of death missing
British Army personnel of World War I
English footballers
1894 births
Association football goalkeepers
1959 deaths
People from Ledbury
Newcastle United F.C. players
Bury F.C. players
Worcestershire Regiment soldiers
Military personnel from Herefordshire